Robert Malcomson McKenzie (born August 16, 1956) is a Canadian hockey commentator who has covered hockey since joining TSN in 1986. As a TSN Hockey Insider and TSN's Draft Expert, McKenzie provides analysis for NHL on TSN telecasts, as well as for the IIHF World Junior Championships, NHL Draft, NHL Trade Deadline, Free Agency, and for six Olympic Winter Games.

Early life and education
McKenzie was born in Toronto and attended Bendale Public School. After graduating from Ryerson Polytechnic University, McKenzie was hired for his first full-time newspaper job at The Sault Star in 1979.

Career
In 1981, McKenzie quit The Sault Star and moved back to Toronto to earn a job in the sports department at one of the mainstream papers. Although he earned a position as a copy editor in The Globe and Mails sports department, he was not offered any full-time positions.

In 1982, McKenzie was offered a position as editor-in-chief of The Hockey News. McKenzie stayed at the magazine for nine years before joining the Toronto Star as a hockey columnist until 1998. While with the Toronto Star, McKenzie was reporting from the Tampa Bay Lightning dressing room after a loss when he was asked to leave by Phil Esposito. Upon refusing, a scuffle ensued and McKenzie filed a complaint with Toronto police claiming assault. McKenzie returned to The Hockey News for three years where he participated in their half-hour segments on The Sports Network (TSN), and was eventually hired as an analyst for Canadian Hockey League games. He was eventually offered a position with TSN's broadcasting team in 2000.

In honour of his reporting skills, McKenzie won the Gemini Award for Best Studio Analyst for his work on the 2008 IIHF World Junior Championship: Gold Final.

In October 2014, McKenzie and Darren Dreger began appearing as full-time contributors on NBCSN. This was due to the fact that TSN lost their NHL broadcasting rights package to Sportsnet. Two years later, he received the 2016 Canadian Screen award for Best Sports Analyst.

McKenzie was awarded the 2015 Elmer Ferguson Memorial Award, as selected by the Professional Hockey Writers Association. He was inducted into the Whitby Sports Hall of Fame in 2017. In 2019, McKenzie signed a five-year contract extension with TSN.

Personal life
McKenzie and his wife Cindy have three sons, all of whom played hockey. Although one of his sons quit the sport due to concussions, his son Mike McKenzie went on to play professionally. Cindy is the older sister of John Goodwin, a former professional ice hockey player.

References

External links 
 TSN.ca biography of Bob McKenzie
 
 

1956 births
Canadian columnists
Canadian newspaper editors
Canadian male journalists
Canadian people of Scottish descent
Elmer Ferguson Award winners
Living people
National Hockey League broadcasters
Olympic Games broadcasters
Journalists from Toronto
Toronto Metropolitan University alumni